is a series of Japanese word puzzle video games developed and published by Bandai Namco Entertainment, formerly Namco. The series began in arcades with Kotoba no Puzzle: Mojipittan in 2001, and has seen multiple sequels for several platforms, including the Game Boy Advance, PlayStation Portable and Nintendo DS. Gameplay is similar to Scrabble — players are tasked with using Hiragana to form words on a board by placing down pieces marked with Hiragana characters.

The original Kotoba no Puzzle was designed by Hiroyuki Goto, who is well known in Japan for being able to recite pi from memory to 42,195 decimal places, making him the world record holder at the time. Likely due to its strong usage of Japanese, the series has remained confined to Japan. The Kotoba no Puzzle series was met with positive reviews from critics, being praised for its originality, multiplayer and addictive gameplay, with Kotoba no Puzzle: Mojipittan DS receiving the "Gold Hall of Fame" award from Famitsu.

Gameplay
Mojipittan is similar in play to the word game Scrabble. The player uses tiles with hiragana to build words.  The player may take turns against the computer or a human opponent or play alone.  Unlike Scrabble, however, each player may place only one tile per turn as opposed to multiple tiles in the former.  Tiles must be placed next to any other tile on the board, space permitting, but at least one word must be formed with each tile placed; as long as these conditions are met, a tile may be placed anywhere on the board, even if not all of the other tiles a new tile is connected to form new words.

A major difference in how the game plays in contrast with Scrabble is that words do not need to be isolated.

For example, in the play pictured above, with the bold letter う (u) being played, in addition to つうか (tsuuka, either 通過, meaning "passing", or 通貨, meaning "currency"), つう (通 or tsuu, meaning "connoisseur") and うか (羽化 or uka, meaning "eclosion") qualify as words. The horizontal words that qualify in this play are ふつう (普通 or futsuu, meaning "normal"), つうち (通知 or tsuuchi, meaning "notification"), and うち (内 or uchi, meaning "inside"), as well as つう again.  Forming multiple words with the placement of a single tile is termed a "chain".

Stages have objectives such as "fill all the spots on the board", "create twenty words over three tiles long", or "create chains of three, eight times".  The board always has pre-existing tiles that players have to work with.

Games in series
 (2001, Arcade)
 (2003, PlayStation 2)
 (2003, Game Boy Advance, Wii U Virtual Console)
 (2004. PlayStation Portable)
 (2007, Nintendo DS)
 (2008, Wii)
 (2009, Nintendo DSi)
 (2010, iOS, Android)
 (2020, Nintendo Switch, PlayStation 4, Android, iOS, Steam)

Spin-off games
 (2005, i-appli)
 (2007, i-appli)
 (2019, iOS)

Board game
A board game adaptation called  was made by Mega House under Bandai Namco's license and released in 2007.

Reception
On release, Famitsu scored Mojipittan DS a 33 out of 40 (9/8/8/8).

Notes

References

External links
 Official Japanese website

PlayStation 2 games
Bandai Namco Entertainment franchises
Nintendo DS games
DSiWare games
Game Boy Advance games
Japan-exclusive video games
PlayStation Portable games
WiiWare games
Wii Wi-Fi games
Nintendo Wi-Fi Connection games
Touch! Generations
Video games developed in Japan